|}

The Prix de Sandringham is a Group 2 flat horse race in France open to three-year-old thoroughbred fillies. It is run at Chantilly over a distance of 1,600 metres (about 1 mile), and it is scheduled to take place each year in late May or early June.

History
The event was originally called the Prix des Lilas, and it used to be held at Longchamp. During the early part of its history it was contested over 2,000 metres, and it served as a trial for the Prix de Diane. It was cut to its present distance in 1966.

The race was titled the Coupe de Sa Majesté la Reine Elizabeth in 1972, in honour of Queen Elizabeth II, who was attending Longchamp during a state visit to France. It was renamed after Sandringham, the location of the Royal Stud, in 1973.

The Prix de Sandringham was first run at Chantilly in 1977. It returned to Longchamp the following year, and it was transferred more permanently to Chantilly in 1979. For a period it held Group 3 status, and it was promoted to Group 2 level in 2001. It is now staged on the same day as the Prix du Jockey Club.

Records
Leading jockey (3 wins):
 Freddy Head – Opalia (1971), India Song (1980), Alik (1981)
 Cash Asmussen – Action Francaise (1988), Golden Opinion (1989), Once in My Life (1991)
 Thierry Jarnet – Ski Paradise (1993), Lunafairy (1994), Smolensk (1995)
 Olivier Peslier – Banks Hill (2001), Impressionnante (2006), Immortal Verse (2011)

Leading trainer (9 wins):
 André Fabre – Fitzwilliam Place (1987), Action Francaise (1988), Golden Opinion (1989), Marble Maiden (1992), Ski Paradise (1993), Lunafairy (1994), Smolensk (1995), Banks Hill (2001), Fintry (2014)

Leading owner (4 wins):
 Sheikh Mohammed – Golden Opinion (1989), Marble Maiden (1992), Sensation (1996), Maiden Tower (2003)

Winners since 1979

Earlier winners

 1967: Ancyre
 1971: Opalia
 1972: Arosa
 1973: Panpryl
 1974: 
 1975: Hamada
 1976: Guichet
 1977: River Dane
 1978: Calderina

See also
 List of French flat horse races

References
 France Galop / Racing Post:

 france-galop.com – A Brief History: Prix de Sandringham.
 galop.courses-france.com – Prix de Sandringham – Palmarès depuis 1980.
 galopp-sieger.de – Prix de Sandringham.
 horseracingintfed.com – International Federation of Horseracing Authorities – Prix de Sandringham (2016).
 pedigreequery.com – Prix de Sandringham – Chantilly.

Flat horse races for three-year-old fillies
Chantilly Racecourse
Horse races in France